Foveaux FM is a local radio station in Invercargill New Zealand that began operating in May 1981. The station is named after Foveaux Strait which runs between the South Island of New Zealand and Stewart Island. The station was originally started by a group of investors as 4XF Foveaux Radio broadcasting on 1224 AM. In the late eighties the station was sold to Radio Otago and in 1991 Foveaux made the switch to FM when it began broadcasting on 89.2 FM and retained the AM frequency.

In October 2018, with trademark now owned by an Invercargill resident, Foveaux Radio began broadcast licensing tests over Invercargill City on 104.4 FM.

Format
Foveaux FM played a mixture the latest hits as well as older music, the station also ran several talk shows such as Talkback with John Husband on weekday mornings and a sports talk show on Sunday mornings called Sports Comment and Opinion. Evening programming catered to a younger audience with the station running a Top 9 at 9 countdown show. The Foveaux FM night show, during the late nineties, was also simulcast on Resort Radio in Queenstown.

Foveaux was always a live and local station 24 hours a day however some specialist nationwide shows were played on the station over the years these included:
 The Other Top 40 (was on-air Saturdays in 1988)
 Coke Shake 30 Countdown (Saturday Afternoons 1992 – 1995)
 Power Jam Countdown (Saturday Afternoons 1995 – 1997)
 Keeping it Kiwi (Sunday 5PM 1994 – 2001)
 Counting the Beat (Sunday 10PM 1994 – 1997)
 Rock Your Radio (Sunday 11PM Kiwi Music Show) (1994–1997)
 Rick Dees Weekly Top 40 (Sunday Afternoons 2002)

Competition
The stations main competitor was 4ZA which is now known as The Hits Southland. Another local competitor was Hokonui Gold which broadcasts from Gore but both stations can be clearly heard across most of Southland. 
In response to changes in the local and New Zealand radio market, Foveaux FM moved many of their talk related shows to the AM frequency in the late 1990s these shows were later dropped. The station also moved away from targeting the younger audience in the early 2000s, The Top 9 at 9 was replaced by The Eighties at 8.

Studio Location

The Foveaux FM studios were located on the corner or Tay and Kelvin street in Invercargill on the first floor of a building previously used as a hotel, which was known as the Cecil Hotel. The ground floor of the building was used for retail stores. In 2018 MORE FM Southland was relocated to the commercial building at 20 Don street in Invercargill. The original studio building was demolished in March 2020 along with most of the buildings in the surrounding block to make way for the Invercargill Central Mall development.

Rebranding to MORE FM
Foveaux FM was owned by Radio Otago up until 1999. Radio Otago merged with Energy Enterprises in 1999 to form RadioWorks.

In November 2004 Canwest RadioWorks decided to rebrand many of their local heritage stations with the well known More FM brand name and then on 15 January 2005 Foveaux FM became Southlands 89.2 More FM. The change also saw the station reduced to 13 hours a day of local programming when More FM introduced a networked night show and overnight show.

In October 2007 the original Foveaux Radio 1224AM frequency that had been continued to be used for the rebranded More FM station was reassigned to BSport. While BSport was launched as a rebranding of Radio Pacific the old Radio Pacific frequency was used to launch The Breeze into Southland.

Local programming on the rebranded MORE FM station has been reduced over the years. Today the breakfast show, hosted by Gretchen Blomfield and Simon Edwards and a Saturday morning breakfast show are the only regular local shows.

Announcers

Other early names include Jeff Nuth (Day 1 Brekky announcer) Lloyd Keown, Brian Neilson, Luke Terry, Chris Diack, Alan Davis, Mark Stallard, Geoff Baraclough, Blair Hawkins, Craig Farr, Juanita Rae, Larissa Kellet, Grant Millman, Malcolm Jordan, Karen Scott, Peter Wells, Rob Caig, John MacDonald, Jason MacDonald, Warren Filer, Dave Mahoney (PD & Breakfast host), Jim Healy, Mike Rehu and Dave Wallace

References

Radio stations in New Zealand
Mass media in Invercargill
Defunct radio stations in New Zealand
Organisations based in Invercargill